This is a list of members of the 35th Legislative Assembly of Queensland from 1957 to 1960, as elected at the 1957 state election held on 3 August 1957.

 On 13 July 1957, three weeks before the 1957 state election, George Devries, the Labor member for Gregory, died. The election was therefore postponed in Gregory until 5 October 1957, when the Country candidate Wally Rae was elected.
 At the 1957 state election, the seat of Flinders was decided in favour of Country candidate Bill Longeran over Labor incumbent Frank Forde by one vote. The resulting Elections Tribunal, which was conducted by Mr Justice Philp and heard evidence on 17 February 1958, found on 4 March 1958 that one of the presiding officers had "so improperly conducted a poll that the election was void". Longeran won the resulting by-election on 17 May 1958 by 1,948 votes to Forde's 1,534.
 On 29 March 1958, the Labor member for North Toowoomba and Opposition Leader, Les Wood, died. Labor candidate and former Deputy Premier Jack Duggan won the resulting by-election on 31 May 1958, and subsequently became leader of the Labor Party.
 On 26 March 1959, the Country member for Mulgrave, Bob Watson, died. Country candidate Carlisle Wordsworth won the resulting by-election on 6 June 1959.
 On 7 May 1960, three weeks before the 1960 state election, Carlisle Wordsworth, the Country member for Mulgrave, died. The election was therefore postponed in Mulgrave.

See also
1957 Queensland state election
Nicklin Ministry (Country Party) (1957–1968)

References

 Waterson, D.B. Biographical register of the Queensland Parliament, 1930-1980 Canberra: ANU Press (1982)
 

Members of Queensland parliaments by term
20th-century Australian politicians